A Way Out was a Canadian do-it-yourself television show on CBC Television which originally began as a gardening show, but, evolved to include crafts, outdoor activities and do-it-yourself home repairs and improvements. The show was hosted by George Finstad (1970-1974) then Mary Chapman and Laurie Jennings and produced by Doug Lower (1970-1971), Neil Andrews (1971-1974) and Robert Hutt (1974-1976).

Television schedule history 
 Sunday 1:15-1:30 p.m., 7 June 1970 – 19 September 1971
 Sunday 12:45-1:00 p.m., 26 September 1971-
 Monday 4:30-5:00 p.m., 1 April-2 September 1974
 Sunday 12:45-1:00 p.m., 8 September 1974 – 28 September 1975
 Sunday 12:45-1:00 p.m., 5 October 1975 – 31 March 1976
 Sunday 12:15-12:30 p.m., 4 April-
 Sunday 12:15-12:30 p.m., 19 September 1976 – 25 September 1977

External links
 CBC Television archive

1970 Canadian television series debuts
1977 Canadian television series endings
CBC Television original programming
1970s Canadian documentary television series